Marc Moens (born 17 January 1943) is a Belgian sprint canoer who competed in the late 1960s and early 1970s. He was eliminated in the semifinals of the K-1 1000 m event at the 1968 Summer Olympics in Mexico City. Four years later at the 1972 Summer Olympics in Munich, Marc was eliminated in the semifinals of the K-2 1000 m event with teammate Herman Naegels. 

After his sprint career, Marc started paddling in ICF Canoe Marathon World Championships and became world champion in his age category in 2007 in Györ.

Marc Moens is a retired garage holder, and still canoeing (edited april 2022) as a member of Koninklijke Cano Club Gent.

References
Sports-reference.com profile
https://www.standaard.be/cnt/dmf08092007_070

1943 births
Belgian male canoeists
Canoeists at the 1968 Summer Olympics
Canoeists at the 1972 Summer Olympics
Living people
Olympic canoeists of Belgium